This is a list of electricity-generating power stations in the U.S. state of New Mexico, sorted by type and name. In 2020, New Mexico had a total summer capacity of 9,098 MW through all of its power plants, and a net generation of 34,076 GWh. The corresponding electrical energy generation mix in 2021 was 35.5% coal, 28.4% natural gas, 30.2% wind, and 5% solar PV. Petroleum, biomass, geothermal and hydroelectric each generated less than a 0.5% share.

Small-scale solar including customer-owned photovoltaic panels delivered an additional net 462 GWh to New Mexico's electricity grid in 2021. This was about one-quarter of the amount generated by the state's utility-scale photovoltaic plants.

New Mexico hosts the nation's only long-term underground repository for waste from nuclear weapons research and production, the Waste Isolation Pilot Plant near Carlsbad. Extraction of the state's nearby Permian Basin oil reserves for transportation and other uses rose to the nation's third highest, contributing 6% of total U.S. production in 2018. New Mexico's oil extraction included the flaring of over 35 billion cubic feet of associated petroleum gas in each of the years 2018 and 2019. This amount of wasted natural gas could have generated about 5,000 GWh of electrical energy, an amount equal to 14% of the state's total annual generation.

Fossil-fuel power stations
Data from the U.S. Energy Information Administration serves as a general reference.

Coal

Petroleum

Natural gas

Renewable power stations

Data from the U.S. Energy Information Administration serves as a general reference.

Geothermal

Biomass

Hydroelectric

Solar photovoltaic

Wind

Storage power stations

Battery storage

References 

Lists of buildings and structures in New Mexico
New Mexico